Alexander Sligo (1832 – 1 December 1909) was a 19th-century New Zealand politician.

Political career

He was a Conservative, opposed to the Liberal government of Richard Seddon.

References

1832 births
1909 deaths
Members of the New Zealand House of Representatives
New Zealand MPs for Dunedin electorates
Burials at Dunedin Northern Cemetery
19th-century New Zealand politicians